Sowing the Wind is a 1921 American silent drama film directed by John M. Stahl and starring Anita Stewart, James Morrison, and Myrtle Stedman. It is an adaptation of the British play Sowing the Wind by Sydney Grundy which had previously been turned into a 1916 film of the same title.

Cast
 Anita Stewart as Rosamund Athelstane 
 James Morrison as Ned Brabazon 
 Myrtle Stedman as Baby Brabant 
 Ralph Lewis as Brabazon 
 William V. Mong as Watkins 
 Josef Swickard as Petworth 
 Ben Deeley as Cursitor 
 Harry Northrup    
 Margaret Landis   
 William Clifford

Preservation
Copies of Sowing the Wind are in the UCLA Film and Television Archive and George Eastman House Motion Picture Collection.

References

Bibliography
 Goble, Alan. The Complete Index to Literary Sources in Film. Walter de Gruyter, 1999.

External links

1921 films
1921 drama films
Silent American drama films
American silent feature films
1920s English-language films
Films directed by John M. Stahl
American films based on plays
First National Pictures films
American black-and-white films
1920s American films